Clarissa Altagracia de la Rocha de Torres ( de la Rocha Pimentel; born 12 August 1959, Ciudad Trujillo) is an economist from the Dominican Republic. She is serving as vice-governor (or vice-chairperson) of the Central Bank of the Dominican Republic since August 2004.

Early life and family
De la Rocha was born within an upper class family, her parents are the deceased civil servant and columnist Julio Ernesto de la Rocha Báez (son of Julio de la Rocha Carmona and Mercedes Báez Soler), who served as Minister of the Treasury during the dictatorship of Rafael Trujillo, and Altagracia Edith Pimentel. She married engineer Nelson Torres Rodríguez and had three children.

De la Rocha de Torres graduated as Bachelor of Business Administration from Universidad APEC in 1980.

Career
De Torres joined the Central Bank of the Dominican Republic in 1978 as Assistant to the Foreign Exchange Department. De Torres was appointed on 17 August 2004 as vice-chairperson of the Central Bank of the Dominican Republic.

Notes

References

1959 births
Living people
Central bankers
Descendants of Buenaventura Báez
Dominican Republic economists
Dominican Republic people of Basque descent
Dominican Republic people of Spanish descent
People from Santo Domingo
White Dominicans